The North Carolina Research Campus (NCRC) is a public-private research center in Kannapolis, North Carolina, United States.  The Campus was envisioned by David H. Murdock, owner of Dole Food Company and Castle and Cooke, Inc., as a center for improving human health through research into nutrition and agriculture. The campus was formed and operates as a partnership with the State of North Carolina and the University of North Carolina system.

The scientists at the NC Research Campus are known for research that explores the health benefits of plant phytochemicals, nutrients such as choline and the impact of nutrition and exercise on human performance. Research also involves the study of nutrients and plant-based compounds to prevent chronic diseases such as cancer and diabetes.

About 

The North Carolina Research Campus is located in Kannapolis, NC, near Charlotte. As a scientific community of eight universities, the David H. Murdock Research Institute, global companies and entrepreneurs, the shared mission is to improve human health through nutrition. Research and development focuses on safer, more nutritious crops, healthier foods and precision nutrition.

History 

 1982 David H. Murdock, chairman and owner of Dole Food Company bought the textile mill then known as Cannon Mills, the largest manufacturer of home textiles in the world.
 1986  Murdock's firm Pacific Holding Company sells the mill. Murdock retains substantial property holdings in Kannapolis. The mill later became known as Fieldcrest Cannon and later Pillowtex.
 2003 Pillowtex Corporation files for bankruptcy in 2003, and the mill closes. This results in the largest mass layoff of workers in North Carolina history.
 2005  Along with support from the state of North Carolina and the University of North Carolina system, Murdock announces the establishment of the North Carolina Research Campus.
 2006  Murdock acquires the Pillowtex site and demolishes the mill. Construction starts quickly on the North Carolina Research Campus after the six-million-square-foot textile mill is demolished.
 2008  The first building, the 311,000 square-foot David H. Murdock Research Core Laboratory, opens along with the North Carolina State University Plants for Human Health Institute building and the UNC Chapel Hill Nutrition Research Institute building.
 2012 The headquarters of the Cabarrus Health Alliance, the regional public health authority, opens.
 2013 A 60,000 square foot Class A medical office building opens with Carolinas Healthcare System as the main tenant.
 2015  In November, Mark Spitzer is chosen by Murdock to be the new Vice President of Operations for Castle & Cooke North Carolina. In December, Kannapolis dedicates the City Hall & Police Headquarters, a 100,000 square-foot facility standing opposite the David H. Murdock Core Laboratory, on land donated by Murdock.
 2016  BioArmor, a company that employs nanotechnology to produce hand sanitizers that do not use alcohol leases space in the David H. Murdock Core Laboratory. Discovery MS, a non-profit research initiative housed in the David H. Murdock Research Institute, launches with an announcement of several ongoing multiple sclerosis research projects. Ei, A Pharmaceutical Solutionworks™ begins moving a 24-person research and development team, known as Endev Laboratories, into a 10,000-square-foot laboratory with office space on the third floor of the building.
 2017  Ideal Health Biotechnology opens its first office at the North Carolina Research Campus. R&S Chemicals and Klear Optix join the North Carolina Research Campus.  Catawba College joins in partnership with the North Carolina Research Campus to assist with marketing and business development projects. The Standard Process Center for Excellence is announced and will open in 2019 on the first floor of the laboratory building. The North Carolina Food Processing & Innovation Center, a partnership with the NC State and the NC Department of Agriculture, is announced as another tenant in the building.

References

External links 
 
 Guide to the North Carolina Research Campus Papers 2006-2020

2005 establishments in North Carolina
Kannapolis, North Carolina
High-technology business districts in the United States
Economy of North Carolina
Charlotte metropolitan area
Science parks in the United States
Companies based in Charlotte, North Carolina
Duke University
North Carolina State University
Buildings and structures in Cabarrus County, North Carolina

sk:North Carolina State University Centennial Campus